Aleksandr Olegovich Fedorovsky (born 17 April 1959) is a retired Russian swimmer. He competed at the 1980 Summer Olympics, where he won a silver medal in the 4 × 100 m medley relay and finished fourth in the 100 m breaststroke event. In 1978 and 1979 he won the national championships in the 100 m breaststroke.

References

1959 births
Living people
Russian male breaststroke swimmers
Swimmers at the 1980 Summer Olympics
Olympic swimmers of the Soviet Union
Olympic silver medalists for the Soviet Union
Soviet male breaststroke swimmers
Medalists at the 1980 Summer Olympics
Universiade medalists in swimming
Universiade bronze medalists for the Soviet Union
Medalists at the 1981 Summer Universiade
People from Snezhinsk
Sportspeople from Chelyabinsk Oblast